Giovanni Battista Lenardi (active circa 1660, died after 1703) was an Italian painter of the Baroque period, active mainly in Rome.

Lenardi was born in Ascoli Piceno, and trained in Rome with Pietro da Cortona and then Lazzaro Baldi. He painted for the church of Sant'Andrea delle Fratte and the Buonfratelli in Trastevere.

References

Year of birth unknown
1703 deaths
People from Ascoli Piceno
17th-century Italian painters
Italian male painters
18th-century Italian painters
Italian Baroque painters
18th-century Italian male artists